Richard Zenith  (born 23 February 1956, Washington, D.C.) is an American-Portuguese writer and translator, winner of the Pessoa Prize in 2012.

Life
Richard Zenith graduated from the University of Virginia in 1979. He has lived in Colombia, Brazil, France and, since 1987, in Portugal. He is a naturalised Portuguese citizen.

Zenith is widely considered  to be one of the foremost experts on the Portuguese writer Fernando Pessoa. Zenith has translated many of Pessoa's works into English and he has written extensively about Pessoa's poetry, prose and life. He has also translated Carlos Drummond de Andrade, Antero de Quental, Sophia de Mello Breyner, Nuno Júdice, António Lobo Antunes, and Luís de Camões, amongst other Portuguese-language writers.

Zenith curated, together with Carlos Felipe Moisés, the much acclaimed exhibition Fernando Pessoa, Plural como o Universo, dedicated to Pessoa's life and heteronyms, at Lisbon's Gulbenkian Foundation, São Paulo's Museum of Portuguese Language and Rio de Janeiro's Centro Cultural Correios.

In 2021 Zenith published Fernando Pessoa: An Experimental Life, a monumental 1,050 page biography.

Awards
 1987 – Guggenheim Fellowship
 1999 – PEN Award for Poetry in Translation
 2006 – Harold Morton Landon Translation Award
 2012 – Prémio Pessoa
 2022 – Finalist for Pulitzer Prize for Biography or Autobiography for his book Pessoa: A Biography

Works

Translations
  (Carcanet 1991 edition)

Biography 

 Fernando Pessoa: An Experimental Life (2021). Allen Lane (London).
 Pessoa: A Biography (2021). W.W. Norton (New York).

Reviews
As a result, there can be no definitive edition of The Book of Disquiet. Written on and off over a period of more than 20 years, seemingly beginning as a book by another of Pessoa's heteronyms, Vicente Guedes, and slowly evolving into the imaginary testament of Soares, it is a dishevelled album of thoughts, sensations and imagined memories that can never be fully deciphered. Any version is bound to be a construction. In his notes on the text, Richard Zenith recognises this and suggests that readers "invent their own order or, better yet, read the work's many parts in absolutely random order". Despite this disclaimer, readers of Zenith's edition will find it supersedes all others in its delicacy of style, rigorous scholarship and sympathy for Pessoa's fractured sensibility.

References

1956 births
Living people
Writers from Washington, D.C.
University of Virginia alumni
Portuguese–English translators
Translators of Fernando Pessoa
Pessoa Prize winners
20th-century translators
American expatriates in Portugal